Bruce Levingston is an American concert pianist.

Levingston was born and grew up in the Mississippi Delta. He was educated at Darlington School in Rome, Georgia, graduating in 1979.

Levingston has performed many times at Carnegie Hall and Lincoln Center.

Levingston is the Chancellor's Honors College Artist in Residence and holds the Lester Glenn Fant Chair at the University of Mississippi.

He lives in New York City and Oxford, Mississippi.

Recordings
Still Sound
Heart Shadow
Heavy Sleep

References

External links

Living people
Musicians from Mississippi
People from Oxford, Mississippi
American classical pianists
American male classical pianists
Darlington School alumni
21st-century classical pianists
21st-century American pianists
Year of birth missing (living people)
21st-century American male musicians